Road to Ruin, or The Road to Ruin may refer to:

Film
 The Road to Ruin (1913 film), a 1913 silent film starring J. Warren Kerrigan and Charlotte Burton		
 The Road to Ruin (1928 film), a 1928 silent film
 The Road to Ruin (1934 film), the exploitation film directed by Dorothy Davenport and Melville Shyer
 Road to Ruin (1991 film), the mainstream film starring Peter Weller

Literature
 The Road to Ruin (play), a 1792 comedy by Thomas Holcroft
 The Road to Ruin, a John Dortmunder novel by Donald E. Westlake

Music
 Road to Ruin (Ramones album), the 1978 album by the Ramones
 Road to Ruin (The Mr. T Experience album), a 1998 tribute to the Ramones
 The Road to Ruin (John and Beverley Martyn album), a 1970 folk album by John and Beverley Martyn
 "Road to Ruin", a song on Lean into It by Mr. Big
 "Road to Ruin", a song on The Libertines by The Libertines
 "Road to Ruin", a song on Never, Neverland by Annihilator
 "Road to Ruin", a song by on Born Too Late by Church of Misery
 "Road to Ruin", the original title of "Hey Now What You Doing", a song on Waiting for the Sirens' Call by New Order

Other
 Road to Ruin, an internet video show by Sum 41
 The Road to Ruin: The Global Elites' Secret Plan for the Next Financial Crisis, a 2016 book by James Rickards